The 10th Aerobic Gymnastics European Championships take place in Ancona, Italy from September 22 to 24, 2017. The competition took place at PalaRossini in Ancona.

Participating nations

Medalists

Results

Seniors

Men's individual

Women's individual

Mixed pairs

Trios

Groups

Step

Dance

Team

Juniors

Men's individual

Women's individual

Mixed pairs

Trios

Groups

Team

References

External links
Official website

2017 in gymnastics
2017 in Italian sport
Aerobic Gymnastics European Championships
International gymnastics competitions hosted by Italy